Once and for All may refer to:

Once and for All (album), a 1994 album by Loudness
Once and for All (novel), a 2017 novel by Sarah Dessen